Anacampta morosa is a species of ulidiid or picture-winged fly in the genus Anacampta of the family Ulidiidae.

References

Ulidiidae